The General Federation of Trade Unions (GFTU) is a national trade union centre in the United Kingdom. It has 35 affiliates with a membership of just over 214,000 and describes itself as the "federation for specialist unions".

History
In the 1890s, the development of socialist organisations and socialist thinking also found expression in the British trade union movement. Many of the new unions formed during that period were committed to the socialist transformation of society and were critical of the conservatism of the craft unions. The debate  revolved around concept of building "one-big-union"  which would have the resources to embark on a militant course of action and even change society. This thinking gained strength after the 1897 Engineering Employers Federation lockout which resulted in a defeat for engineering workers.

The view that it was necessary to develop a strong, centralised trade union organisation by forming a federation, which had been rejected only two years earlier, was now endorsed at the Trades Union Congress of September 1897. This resulted in the establishment of the General Federation of Trade Unions at a special Congress of the TUC in 1899, the principal objective of which was to set up a national organisation with a strike fund which could be drawn upon by affiliated trade unions.

GFTU participated in the foundation of the International Federation of Trade Unions at the Concertgebouw, Amsterdam in July 1919.

The federation has seen a large turnover of members, due largely to mergers in the movement.  In 1979, its members were:

 Amalgamated Association of Beamers, Twisters and Drawers
 Amalgamated Felt Hat Trimers', Woolformers' and Allied Workers' Union
 Amalgamated Society of Journeymen Felt Hatters and Allied Workers
 Amalgamated Textile Workers' Union
 Amalgamated Union of Asphalt Workers
 Associated Metalworkers' Union
 Card Setting Machine Tenters' Society
 Ceramic and Allied Trades Union
 Cloth Pressers' Society
 Furniture, Timber and Allied Trades Union
 General Union of Associations of Loom Overlookers
 Hinckley Dyers' and Auxiliary Association
 Huddersfield Healders and Twisters Trade and Friendly Society
 Jewel Case and Jewellery Display Makers' Union
 Lancashire Amalgamated Tape Sizers' Association
 Lancashire Box, Packing Case and General Woodworkers' Society
 National Association of Licensed House Managers
 National Society of Brushmakers and General Workers
 National Society of Metal Mechanics
 National Union of Hosiery and Knitwear Workers
 National Union of Lock and Metal Workers
 National Union of Tailors and Garment Workers
 Nelson and District Association of Preparatory Workers
 Northern Carpet Trade Union
 Nottingham and District Dyers' and Bleachers' Association
 Rossendale Union of Boot, Shoe and Slipper Operatives
 Scottish Lace and Textile Workers' Union
 Screw, Nut, Bolt and Rivet Trade union
 Society of Shuttlemakers
 Tobacco Mechanics' Association
 Yorkshire Society of Textile Craftsmen

By 2016, none of the 1979 members remained as independent unions.

Current role
The GFTU now concentrates on servicing the needs of specialist unions. It does this by  providing courses, undertaking research for its affiliated Unions and administering a Pension Scheme for officials and staff of affiliated Unions. In keeping with its original objectives, the Federation pays dispute benefit in appropriate cases to affiliated Unions.

The Governing Body is the Biennial General Council Meeting, attended by  delegates from affiliated Unions, at which policy and rule changes are debated and an Executive Committee of 14 members elected to meet on a monthly basis between Biennial General Council Meetings.

The Federation undertakes its Parliamentary activities by working closely with John Mann MP, Member of Parliament Bassetlaw constituency, particularly in respect of proposed legislation.

Affiliated unions
 Aegis the Union
 Artists' Union England
 Association of Educational Psychologists
 Bakers, Food and Allied Workers Union
 Communication Workers' Union
 Community
 Coordinating Committee of International Staff Unions and Associations of the United Nations System
 Equal Justice The Union
 Football Medicine and Performance Association
 Gibraltar General and Clerical Association
 Institute of Football Management and Administration
 League Managers Association
 Napo
 Nautilus International
 NHBC Staff Association
 Pharmacists' Defence Association
 POA
 Professional Cricketers' Association
 Professional Footballers' Association
 Psychotherapy and Counselling Union
 Public and Commercial Services Union
 Social Workers' Union
 Society of Union Employees
 Transport Salaried Staffs Association (TSSA)
 Voice (as of October 2020, part of Community)
 Workers' Educational Association

General Secretaries
1899: Isaac Mitchell
1907: William A. Appleton
1938: George Bell
1953: Leslie Hodgson
1978: Peter Potts
1991: Michael Bradley
2010: Doug Nicholls
2023: Gawain Little

Chairs

See also

 List of trade unions
 List of trade unions in the United Kingdom
 List of federations of trade unions
 Trades Union Congress
 Scottish Trades Union Congress
 Irish Congress of Trade Unions

References

External links
 GFTU official website
 Catalogue of the GFTU archives, held at the Modern Records Centre, University of Warwick

 
Borough of Charnwood
National trade union centres of the United Kingdom
Trade unions established in 1899
1899 establishments in the United Kingdom
Trade unions based in Leicestershire